HWW may refer to:

 HWW Limited, an Australian data management company
 Harzwasserwerke, a German water works and dam operator
 Henry Wise Wood Senior High School, in Calgary, Alberta, Canada
 High wind warning
 Hilton Worldwide, an American hospitality company
 Hinterland Who's Who, a series of Canadian public service announcements
 Holyoke Water Works, a public drinking water utility in Holyoke, Massachusetts
 How Wood railway station, in England